Lucien Parent (born Pierre Ovide Lucien Parent; April 29, 1893 – May 27, 1956) was a prolific architect, designer, illustrator, and watercolorist.  He and his wife Florence Courteau had a family of nine children. He was also a member of the Royal Canadian Academy of Arts.

Buildings designed by Lucien Parent
 Basilique Saint Joseph's Oratory at Montreal begin 1924 with Dom Paul Bellot and Ernest Cormier
 Maison Arthur Dubuc.
 Pine Court Apartments, at Montreal in 1929 with Siméon Brais
 J. Edmond Morins building, at Montreal in 1930 avec Henri S. Labelle
 Church of St. Andrew and St. Paul at Montreal, complete rebuilding, modifications and moving of emplacement in 1931
 Cégep Gérald-Godin, at Montreal in 1932
 Maison Émile Corbeil, at Montreal in 1936
 Saint-Jean-Berchmans Church, at Montreal in 1938 with René-Rodolphe Tourville
 Notre Dame du Très Saint Sacrement church, at Ferme-Neuve in 1939 with René-Rodolphe Tourville
 Notre Dame de Lourde church, at Notre-Dame-de-Pontmain in 1940
 Saint Antoine church, at Saint-Antoine in 1945
 Saint Hugues church, at Lac-Saguay in 1947
 Très Saint Sacrement church, at Lachine in 1950
 Sainte-Adèle church, at the request of its good friend, Claude-Henri Grignon, author of the novel Séraphin: Heart of Stone in (1951).
 Saint Raphael church, at La Malbaie in 1951
 Pharmacie Montréal, at Montreal in 1951

References

External links 
 History of the Musée des Maîtres et Artisans du Québec
 Lucien Parent architect Image Montréal
 (Fr)Le patrimoine religieux de Montréal pdf
 (Fr) Lucien Parent Mémoire du Québec.com
 Illustration of the Arch by Lucien Parent
 Historic Places in Canada

Architects from Montreal
Canadian architects
1893 births
1956 deaths